Aulacolius triordinatus is a species of beetle in the family Carabidae, the only species in the genus Aulacolius.

References

Lebiinae